Kwahu Nsaba is a town in the Kwahu west District in the Eastern region of Ghana.

The town is known for the production of earthenware bowl (called "Ayiwa" in the Akan language).

Location 
Kwahu Nsaba is located along the Accra - Kumasi Highway.

References 

Populated places in the Eastern Region (Ghana)